Leslie Bertrand Lindsay (July 23, 1881 – November 11, 1960) was a Canadian professional ice hockey goaltender in the National Hockey Association (NHA), Pacific Coast Hockey Association (PCHA), and National Hockey League (NHL). Born in West Garafraxa, Ontario, Bert Lindsay was the father of Hockey Hall of Fame player Ted Lindsay.

Playing career
Between 1903 and 1909 Lindsay played amateur hockey for a number of different teams, most notably with Renfrew in the Ottawa Valley Hockey League and the Federal Amateur Hockey League, and in 1907 and 1908 he won two consecutive Citizen Shield as Ottawa Valley champions with Renfrew.

Lindsay turned professional in 1910 and played two seasons for the Renfrew Millionaires in the NHA. When the team disbanded he moved west and joined the Victoria Aristocrats of the PCHA for three seasons before returning to the NHA with the Montreal Wanderers.

Lindsay stayed with the Wanderers when they joined the NHL in 1917, and was the first goalie in league history to earn a win, when his Wanderers defeated the Toronto Arenas 10-9 in the league's first game, in Montreal. After the Westmount Arena, the home arena of the Wanderers, burned down in January 1918, Lindsay was left without a team for the remainder of the season.

Lindsay signed with the Toronto Arenas for the 1918–19 NHL season and retired when the season ended.

Career statistics

Regular season and playoffs

References

External links

 

1881 births
1960 deaths
Canadian ice hockey goaltenders
Montreal Wanderers (NHA) players
Montreal Wanderers (NHL) players
Renfrew Hockey Club players
Toronto Arenas players
Victoria Aristocrats players
Ice hockey people from Ontario
People from Centre Wellington